Viliami Veasii Veikune, styled Lord Tuihaateiho is a Tongan noble, politician, and Member of the Legislative Assembly of Tonga.  He is the 15th person to hold the Tuihaateiho title, and was appointed to it on 5 June 2004.

He grew up and was educated in Hawaii & Alaska.

He served for a time as Chairman of the Tonga Body Builders Association.

Tuihaateiho was elected as a noble representative for Ha'apai in the 2005 and 2008 elections.  He was re-elected in the 2010 elections.

In December 2010 Tuihaateiho was charged with possession of an illegal firearm. If convicted, he would lose his seat in Parliament. Before his trial, however, Parliament adopted an amendment to the Arms and Ammunition Act, lessening the potential sentence that he faced (and which Lord Tuilakepa was facing on a similar charge), so that if convicted he would nonetheless retain his seat in Parliament. The Democratic Party of the Friendly Islands, which had opposed the amendment, asked King George Tupou V to veto it, which he did.

Lord Tuihaateiho appeared before a magistrate's court on 11 June 2012. His counsel was fellow MP Siosifa Tuutafaiva. Following conviction, he was sentenced on 6 March 2015 to a 2,400 pa'anga fine.

On 2 July 2012, following Lord Tuiafitu's resignation from the position of Deputy Speaker of the Legislative Assembly to become Minister for Health, Lord Tu‘iha‘teiho became Deputy Speaker in his place.

Honours
National honours
  Order of the Crown of Tonga, Commander (31 July 2008).

References

Living people
Year of birth missing (living people)
Members of the Legislative Assembly of Tonga
Tongan nobles
People from Haapai
Tongan politicians convicted of crimes
Commanders of the Order of the Crown of Tonga